People's Bank, or variations such as People's State Bank or People's National Bank Building, may refer to a number of banks or bank buildings:

Austria and Germany
Volksbank, co-operative banks in Austria and Germany
 Volksbanken, member banks of the German Cooperative Financial Group

Canada
Bank of the People, a defunct bank in Upper Canada (now Ontario, Canada)
La Banque du Peuple, a defunct bank in Lower Canada (now Quebec, Canada)
Peoples Group, a financial services firm consisting of a trust company and direct bank

China
People's Bank of China, the Central Bank of the People's Republic of China

France
 Groupe Banque Populaire

Georgia
People's Bank of Georgia, headquartered in Tbilisi, Georgia

Italy
Banca Popolare (disambiguation), several institutions

Slovenia
People's Savings Bank (Celje)

Spain
Banco Popular Español

Sri Lanka
People's Bank (Sri Lanka), a state-owned commercial bank

Tanzania
People's Bank of Zanzibar, a commercial bank

United States

Popular, Inc. (Banco Popular), a bank operating in the United States and Puerto Rico
People's United Financial (formerly People's Bank), headquartered in Bridgeport, Connecticut
People's State Bank (Orangeville, Illinois), listed on the National Register of Historic Places (NRHP) in Illinois
Peoples National Bank (Pella, Iowa) , listed on the NRHP in Marion County, Iowa
PeoplesBank, a community bank in Western Massachusetts
Peoples Federal Savings Bank, headquartered in Brighton, Massachusetts; see 
People's Bank and Trust Company Building, listed on the NRHP in New Jersey
People's Bank of Buffalo, New York
People's Bank and Trust, Rocky Mount, North Carolina, merged into Centura Bank
Peoples Bank (Marietta, Ohio), a community bank in Marietta, Ohio
People's National Bank Building (Rock Hill, South Carolina), listed on the NRHP in South Carolina
People's National Bank Building (Tyler, Texas), listed on the NRHP in Texas
People's Bank of Eggleston, listed on the NRHP in Virginia
People's Bank (Weirton, West Virginia), listed on the NRHP in West Virginia